Frederick Ferguson McLean (March 16, 1893 — November 18, 1971)  was a Canadian ice hockey defenceman. He played 8 games between 1919 and 1921 with the Quebec Bulldogs and Hamilton Tigers of the National Hockey League, while the rest of his career was spent mainly as an amateur player in New Brunswick and Nova Scotia.

Career statistics

Regular season and playoffs

External links

1893 births
1971 deaths
Canadian ice hockey defencemen
Hamilton Tigers (ice hockey) players
Ice hockey people from New Brunswick
People from Carleton County, New Brunswick
Quebec Bulldogs players